"Wait" is a Pop song by Scottish singer Maggie Reilly. It was released in 1992 as the album's third single. The song was written by Gavin Hodgson, Maggie Reilly, Stuart MacKillop and A. Seibold and produced by Armand Volker and Stefan Zauner. The single's B-side was written by Stefan Zauner and also appeared on the album.

Formats and track listings
CD Single
"Wait" (Radio Edit) – 3:51
"Wait" (Special Radio Edit) – 2:43
"You'll Never Lose" – 3:29

Charts

References

1992 singles
Maggie Reilly songs
1992 songs
EMI Records singles